The Other Boleyn Girl (2001) is a historical novel written by British author Philippa Gregory, loosely based on the life of 16th-century aristocrat Mary Boleyn (the sister of Anne Boleyn) of whom little is known. Inspired by Mary's life story, Gregory depicts the annulment of one of the most significant royal marriages in English history (that of King Henry VIII and Catherine of Aragon) and conveys the urgency of the need for a male heir to the throne. Much of the history is highly distorted in her account.

Reviews were mixed; some say the book was a brilliantly claustrophobic look at palace life in Tudor England, while others are troubled by the lack of historical accuracy.

The novel was followed by a sequel called The Queen's Fool, set during the reign of Henry's daughter, Queen Mary. The Queen's Fool was followed by The Virgin's Lover, set during the early days of Queen Elizabeth I's reign.

Plot
In 1521 England, Queen Catherine of Aragon's failure to provide King Henry VIII a male heir has strained their marriage. Thomas Boleyn and his brother-in-law Thomas Howard, the Duke of Norfolk, plan to install Boleyn's youngest daughter Mary, wife of courtier William Carey, as the king's mistress. Mary's sister Anne, who recently returned from the French court, and brother George help Mary prepare, and Henry soon takes a liking to Mary. Meanwhile, Queen Catherine becomes displeased with the situation, as she considered Mary one of her dear ladies-in-waiting. Before long, Mary becomes pregnant with the king's child.

Both the Howard and Boleyn families receive lands and titles as a reward for their service, elevating their status amongst the other noble families of the royal court. Anne catches the eye of Henry Percy, heir presumptive to the Duchy of Northumberland, and marries him in secret. Percy, however, is set to marry Mary Talbot, the daughter of the Earl of Shrewsbury. Cardinal Thomas Wolsey discovers and forbids the union. Anne's family sends her to Hever Castle as punishment for the potential scandal.

Mary gives birth to a daughter in 1524 and names her Catherine. While disappointed, the king becomes determined to impregnate her with a son, and Mary soon becomes pregnant again. George marries Jane Parker, another of the queen's ladies-in-waiting, but their marriage is unhappy. Anne returns to court on her family's orders to ensure Henry is not distracted from Mary. Instead of doing as she's told, Anne seduces the king and wins him over. Mary eventually gives birth to a son, who she names after the king. She realizes, however, it is not enough as everyone will consider the child illegitimate.

As Mary focuses her attention on her children and starts losing favor with Henry, her family begins supporting Anne in her quest to win the king over. Anne puts pressure on Henry to set Queen Catherine aside, refusing to give in to his desires until they are married. Henry, however, finds himself unable to do so with religious opposition. With Anne entertaining the king, Mary is tasked with sleeping with him to prevent his attention from going elsewhere. She visits her children every summer at Hever and soon reconciles with her husband.

Eventually, Queen Catherine stands trial for the validity of her marriage to Henry. The king believes she consummated her previous marriage with his dead brother, Prince Arthur, and did not come into their marriage a virgin. The Queen is banished, and Anne, now engaged to marry Henry, adopts Mary's son to ensure she has a male heir to the throne. Mary, meanwhile, loses her husband to the sweating sickness. Anne's determination to become queen reaches new heights while George becomes the subject of suspicions that he is engaging in relationships with male courtiers.

Essex landowner William Stafford begins courting Mary, who becomes attracted to him because of his love for her children and the possibility of living the simple country life he can offer her. Anne suffers a decline in popularity during her travels abroad, culminating in the King and Queen of France, who do not tolerate her position, refusing to meet her. She eventually sleeps with Henry after he grants her a title and marries him when he installs a new Archbishop and proclaims himself Head of the Church of England. Anne gives birth to a daughter in 1533, who she names Elizabeth. Mary marries William but receives orders to stay at court until Anne gives birth to a son. Anne, however, starts to lose the king's favor after several miscarriages and stillbirths.

Henry suffers an injury to his leg while jousting in 1536, and his time recovering stokes worries that public sentiment is turning. Meanwhile, Anne grows increasingly paranoid, convinced she has lost the support of her family and the country and that Henry is in love with lady-in-waiting Jane Seymour. 
She rejoices in her new pregnancy after hearing news of Queen Catherine's death but soon miscarries. Henry discovers the child was born severely malformed and begins courting Jane Seymour as rumors that Anne is a witch spread.

Mary makes plans with William to travel for the country to avoid the turmoil. Before they can do so, Henry places Anne and George under arrest on charges of adultery and incest due to widespread belief that they slept together to give Anne her much-needed son. Anne later presents herself before the Privy Council, which finds her guilty.  George and his lover are also convicted and beheaded.

Anne is sent to the scaffold on the promise that her punishment is exile to a nunnery. As it becomes clear that King Henry will not be attending, Mary realizes that he intended to execute Anne, who dies by beheading. Mary leaves London with William and both children the same day.

Characters 
 Mary Boleyn/Carey/Stafford: The main character of the story, told from her point of view. Mary is portrayed as an innocent, sexually naïve, young girl who, forced by her family, engages in an affair with Henry VIII under the influence of her sister Anne and her brother George. The novel begins when Mary is thirteen and ends just days after Anne's execution.
 Anne Boleyn: Anne is Mary's elder, more ambitious, sister (although research suggests that she was the younger of the two girls). Anne makes her first appearance at the beginning of the story when she is fifteen. At first, she is instructed to guide Mary in seducing Henry, but later steals Henry's affections when she aims to overthrow Catherine as queen. Anne is portrayed as coldhearted and selfish, but will occasionally show affection to Mary and her family.
 George Boleyn: George is the eldest Boleyn child, and eventually Viscount Rochford. He is shown as caring and supportive to Mary, particularly when she is forced to stop her affair with Stafford. It is implied that he is sexually attracted to Anne, and is conducting an affair with Francis Weston. At the end of the book, George is executed, along with the others accused of committing adultery with Anne.
 Henry VIII: King of England, Henry first beds Mary, but is diverted by Anne, who refuses him sexual favors unless he makes her Queen. Though well-meaning, Henry is shown to be easily persuaded by Anne, and quick-tempered.
 William Carey: Mary's first husband, he dies half-way through the story from an outbreak of the sweating sickness.
 William Stafford: Mary's second husband who pursues Mary, and on the voyage to France, the two begin an affair. Later in the novel, they are married in secret, and have one daughter together, Anne (named in honor of the Queen). William genuinely loved Mary, and her two elder children, and was willing to help her retrieve her son Henry from Anne's wardship. At the end of the novel, she and William leave for the country with the three children.
 Catherine of Aragon: Queen Consort of England, she has been married to Henry VIII for two decades but they have only one daughter together. A strict Catholic, she puts religious pressure on the King to not divorce her.

Historical accuracy
Mary Boleyn was the sister of the more famous Anne Boleyn. As such, she is usually mentioned in the numerous biographies that have been written about Anne, but never in any substantial detail.
Mary, unlike Anne, has been claimed to be the mistress of two kings – Francis I of France and Henry VIII of England. She was born sometime between 1499 and 1508. A popular but unverifiable legend suggests that Mary was considered the prettier of the two sisters while Anne was witty, intelligent and charismatic. 
Mary was married twice, first to William Carey, and second to William Stafford. She died in her early forties in 1543.

Areas of disputed historical accuracy include the following:
 Birth order and early lives of the siblings. Many histories, including Eric Ives's biography of Anne Boleyn, present evidence that Mary was the elder sister, and the eldest of the Boleyn children, whereas The Other Boleyn Girl presents Mary as the youngest of her siblings. George is portrayed as being born in 1503, Anne in 1507, and Mary in 1508. However, most historians agree Mary was born around 1500, Anne about 1501 and George about 1507, so that Anne was the younger of the two sisters. Mary's grandson knew she was the eldest, according to the claim he made to his great-grandfather's titles, which he based on Mary having been the eldest, and which was certainly believed by his cousin, Elizabeth I, who offered him the titles in 1596.
 Sexuality of George Boleyn. The book depicts George Boleyn as being homosexual, in love with Francis Weston, but sexually attracted to his sister Anne and willing to commit incest with her. American academic Retha Warnicke postulated George Boleyn and his associates might have been homosexual, but no contemporary evidence supports the theory. However, George Cavendish in "Metrical Visions" wrote that he was a notorious seducer of women. Also, no contemporary records mention Anne Boleyn giving birth to a deformed foetus, which Gregory depicts and the characters interpret as possible evidence of incest.
 Paternity of Mary Boleyn's children. It has long been rumoured that Henry VIII fathered one or both of Mary Boleyn's children, originating from a report made in 1531 by an anti-Boleyn prior and Catherine of Aragon adherent, who had never seen the boy. There is some debate, with Sally Varloe, G. W. Bernard (author of The King's Reformation), and Joanna Denny (author of Anne Boleyn: a new life of England's tragic Queen and Katherine Howard: a Tudor conspiracy) arguing that he may have been Henry Tudor's son. Some writers, such as Alison Weir, consider it unlikely that Henry Carey (Mary's son) was fathered by the King.
 Role of Thomas and Elizabeth Boleyn. The Other Boleyn Girl depicts Mary's parents as devoid of affection for their daughters, and eager to use both as sexual pawns for political gain. Sources such as Anne Boleyn by Marie-Louise Bruce (1972) suggest that Mary's parents did not encourage her sexual escapades and were horrified when she was sent home from France in disgrace.
 Anne Boleyn's wardship of Henry Carey. Anne Boleyn took on Mary's son as her ward after his father's death during an outbreak of sweating sickness and supplied him with an education at a respectable Cistercian monastery. This was a common practice in the Tudor nobility and one very similar to the situation faced by dozens of young aristocratic children, including Anne and Mary's cousin, Katherine Howard, who was raised by her grandmother when her father was penniless. Anne's actions are usually seen as kind by contemporaries and historians, but the novel presents it differently: Anne "steals" Mary's son the year after Henry VIII has made it clear that he intends to marry her, to make herself more politically attractive to the king. It is shown both as a cruel act and as an adoption in the modern sense, in which the child's caretakers are considered his legal and social parents. Anne secured Mary a highly respectable pension of £100 a year.
 Sexual experience of Mary Boleyn. Mary is depicted in The Other Boleyn Girl as a sexually inexperienced young girl when she begins her affair with the king. In fact, however, she acquired a reputation for promiscuity at the court of Francis I of France, who stated that he had known her "per una grandissima ribalda, infame sopra tutti [a great slut, infamous above all]." Although Francis called her "the English mare," and estimated how often he had ridden her, Mary was never one of his favoured maitresse en titre. Due to her sexual laxness, she appears to have been recalled from the French court in 1519, shaming the Boleyn family. Genealogist Anthony Hoskins contradicts Mary Boleyn's reputation for having been sexually active at an early age; denies that Mary was extensively educated at the French court like her sister; and declares that "It is now established that it was Anne Boleyn, and not her sister Mary, who lived at the Flemish and French courts as a child," as if this fact had not been known for centuries. Hoskins further speculates that the French king's comments on Mary's reputation were not based on her early behaviour, claiming that he possibly had met her in 1520 at the Field of Cloth of Gold. In fact, both Mary and Anne spent time at the French court. 
 Motivations and characterisation of Anne Boleyn. The Guardian described Anne as having been presented as "a scheming trollop," and expressed incredulity at such a characterisation. In The Other Boleyn Girl, Anne Boleyn is presented as cold, vindictive, ruthlessly ambitious, vain, and given to physical violence; this is not supported by contemporary accounts. She was certainly complex: highly intelligent, fluently bilingual, politically astute, artistically gifted, loyal to her family, generous to friends, and known for her charm and elegance, notwithstanding arrogance and a notorious temper when stressed. During her time abroad, she was reported to have been sweet and kind. Feminist scholars objected to Gregory's characterisation and praise Anne Boleyn as a feminist icon.<ref>Lindsey, Karen (1995) Divorced, Beheaded, Survived: a feminist reinterpretation ...</ref>
 Incest between Anne and George Boleyn. Historically, Anne Boleyn was charged by Henry's appointed officials of committing incest with her brother. The novel heavily implies but does not state that Anne, convinced that Henry VIII could not give her a healthy son, resorts to incest with her brother. Both the 2003 BBC production of The Other Boleyn Girl and the 2008 film with Natalie Portman depict the two attempting but not committing incest. None of the sources Gregory listed in her bibliography questions Anne Boleyn's innocence. Gregory used two biographies of Anne, one by the American historian Retha Warnicke and another source by Marie-Louise Bruce (1972). Both these writers insisted that Anne was innocent, as did books by David Loades, Alison Weir, and Lacey Baldwin Smith that Gregory had used when researching the story. There is no evidence supporting Gregory's assertion that Anne had three miscarriages. Gregory ignores the argument that part of the reason Anne was executed was because of her political and religious leanings, which her brother shared and supported.

Adaptations
 The Other Boleyn Girl (2003), telefilm directed by Philippa Lowthorpe
 A 90-minute television drama based on the novel was broadcast by the BBC in 2003. It had a relatively low production budget of £750,000 and was filmed using modern camera techniques, with much of the script improvised. Jodhi May played Anne Boleyn, Natascha McElhone played Mary, Steven Mackintosh played George, Jared Harris played Henry VIII, and Philip Glenister played Stafford. It received mixed reviews.
 The Other Boleyn Girl (2008), film directed by Justin Chadwick
 A 2008 feature film adaptation starred Scarlett Johansson as Mary, Natalie Portman as Anne, Jim Sturgess as George, Eric Bana as Henry VIII and Eddie Redmayne as Stafford. In Translating Henry to the Screen, a bonus feature on the DVD release of the film, screenwriter Peter Morgan discusses the dilemma he faced in adapting Philippa Gregory's 600-plus-page novel for the screen. He ultimately decided to use it merely as a broad guideline for his script, which Gregory felt perfectly captured the essence of her book, although many plot elements were eliminated, diminished, or changed. Among the more notable deviations in the film, Mary's marriage to William Stafford, a major part of the book, is mentioned only in a note just before the closing credits, there is no mention of Anne's "stealing" Mary's son to keep a grip on the king's favour (there was a scene designed to vaguely cover that, but it was cut from the film), Anne becomes pregnant with Elizabeth after being raped by Henry, Anne and George decide against committing incest, Mary adopts Elizabeth at the end of the film. In addition to this, the character of Elizabeth Boleyn is almost the opposite of that in the book and she is portrayed as protective of her daughters against their father and uncle and critical of the family's social climbing at the expense of their moral integrity.

See also

 Anne Boleyn in popular culture
SequelsThe Queen's FoolThe Virgin's LoverThe Constant PrincessThe Boleyn InheritanceThe Other Queen''

References

External links
Philippa Gregory official website

2002 British novels
Historical novels
Novels set in Tudor England
Cultural depictions of Henry VIII
Cultural depictions of Anne Boleyn
Cultural depictions of Catherine of Aragon
Novels by Philippa Gregory
Mary Boleyn
Novels about royalty
Works about sisters
British novels adapted into films
British novels adapted into television shows
Fiction set in the 1530s
Fiction set in the 1520s
Charles Scribner's Sons books